Mariana Fonseca Ribeiro Carvalho de Moraes (born 26 November 1986) is a Brazilian politician. Although born in São Paulo she has spent her political career representing Rondônia, having served as federal deputy representative since 2015.

Early life and education
Carvalho was born to a medic, Aparício Carvalho, and Maria Sílvia Carvalho, a journalist, lawyer, economist, and professor of history. Her  father was the vereador/councilman of Porto Velho, federal deputy and vice governor of Rondônia.

Mariana holds a degree in law and medicine, and as of 2016 was completing medical residency in cardiology.

Political career

Pinato voted in favor of the impeachment against then-president Dilma Rousseff and political reformation. She would later vote in favor of opening a corruption investigation against Rousseff's successor Michel Temer, and voted in favor of the 2017 Brazilian labor reforms.

In 2017 Carvalho was elected head of her party for the state of Rondônia.

References

1986 births
Living people
People from São Paulo
Brazilian Social Democracy Party politicians
Members of the Chamber of Deputies (Brazil) from Rondônia
21st-century Brazilian women politicians